Shylo Malsawmtluanga, popularly known as Mama, is an Indian footballer who last played for Aizawl FC in the I-League, primarily as a winger. He was the first footballer from Mizoram to play for the national team and the Kolkata clubs Mohun Bagan and East Bengal.

Honours

East Bengal
ASEAN Club Championship: 2003

India U20
 South Asian Games Silver medal: 2004

References

External links
 

1984 births
Living people
Mizo people
People from Aizawl
Indian footballers
India international footballers
India youth international footballers
I-League players
Footballers from Mizoram
East Bengal Club players
Salgaocar FC players
Mohun Bagan AC players
United SC players
Indian Super League players
Odisha FC players
Southern Samity players
Aizawl FC players
Association football wingers
South Asian Games silver medalists for India
South Asian Games medalists in football